Nikesh Singh (born 24 February 1999) is a Singaporean footballer currently playing as a midfielder for Hougang United.

Career statistics

Club

Notes

References

Living people
1999 births
Singaporean footballers
Singaporean people of Punjabi descent
Singaporean sportspeople of Indian descent
Association football midfielders
Singapore Premier League players